Lavrovo is a rural locality (a village) and the administrative center of Lavrovskoye Rural Settlement, Sudogodsky District, Vladimir Oblast, Russia. The population was 702 as of 2010. There are 12 streets.

Geography 
Lavrovo is located 5 km north of Sudogda (the district's administrative centre) by road. Spas-Beseda is the nearest rural locality.

References 

Rural localities in Sudogodsky District